The Prayag Film City, also known as the Midnapore Film City or Chandrakona Film City or Bengal film city is an integrated film city, located at Chandrakona, West Midnapore, 165 km from Kolkata. Built by the Prayag Group, over an area of 1,600 acres making it second-largest film city and costing . The mega size integrated complex and a one-stop entertainment is to be opened to the public in two phases.

This is the first of its kind film-making arena in Asia. The complex's first phase, designed by the noted art director Nitish Roy, is opened to public from 15 April 2012. The official brand ambassador of the film city complex is Bollywood star Shahrukh Khan, who is also West Bengal's tourism brand ambassador.

A part of the location burned down in a large fire in March 2019.

See also
 Cinema of India
 Film and Television Institute of India
 State Institute of Film and Television
 Satyajit Ray Film and Television Institute

References

External links
 Prayag Group, Official Website
 Details of Prayag Film City
 Prayag Film City – news & updates

Indian film studios
Cinema of Bengal
Paschim Medinipur district
2012 establishments in West Bengal
Film production companies based in Kolkata